WGBF (1280 kHz) is an AM radio station broadcasting a News Talk Information format. Licensed to Evansville, Indiana, United States, the station serves the Evansville area.  The station is currently owned by Townsquare Media and features programming from Fox News Radio, Compass Media Networks, Premiere Networks, Radio America, and Westwood One.

The station currently carries a conservative programming line-up, including Sean Hannity, Laura Ingraham, Mark Levin, Dennis Miller, and Glenn Beck. Also heard on the station are Dave Ramsey and Coast to Coast AM.  Purdue University, Indianapolis Colts and local high school football broadcasts can also be found on WGBF.

WGBF broadcasts from a two tower array near the intersection of Morgan Ave. and Burkhardt Road in Evansville.  However, only one tower is used for daytime operation.

History
WGBF first broadcast in 1923, and became a licensed facility in 1925.  The station changed its call sign to WWOK on October 23, 1989.  Then, on August 28, 1995, the station changed its call sign back to WGBF.

References

External links
FCC History Cards for WGBF

News and talk radio stations in the United States
Radio stations established in 1923
GBF
Townsquare Media radio stations